Chelanga is a surname of Kenyan origin that may refer to:

Joshua Chelanga (born 1973), Kenyan marathon runner and older brother of Sam
Sam Chelanga (born 1985), Kenyan long-distance runner and American collegiate record holder

Kalenjin names